There are two places in New Zealand called Mayfield:

 Mayfield, Canterbury, a settlement in Canterbury
 Mayfield, Marlborough, a suburb of Blenheim